Tanya Landman is an English author of children's and young adult books. She is also a performer and scriptwriter for Storybox Theatre, a puppet theatre based in Devon, England. She is the niece of the actor Robert Shaw.

Awards 
Landman won the 2015 CILIP Carnegie Medal for her novel Buffalo Soldier. She also won a Western Writers of America 2009 Spur Award for her novel I Am Apache.

Her work has also been shortlisted for numerous other awards: the 2008 Booktrust Teenage Prize for Apache; the 2010 Bolton Children's Book Award and 2010 Red House Children's Book Award for Mondays are Murder; and the 2008 Guardian Children's Fiction Prize for The Goldsmith's Daughter.

References

External links 
 Tanya Landman's Website
 The Storybox Theatre Website

Year of birth missing (living people)
Living people
Carnegie Medal in Literature winners
English children's writers
English women writers